The Whitsunday Region is a local government area located in North Queensland, Australia. Established in 2008, it was preceded by two previous local government areas with a history extending back to the establishment of regional local government in Queensland in 1879.

It has an estimated operating budget of A$48.8m.

History 
Prior to 2008, the new Whitsunday Region was an entire area of two previous and distinct local government areas:

 the Shire of Bowen;
 and the Shire of Whitsunday.

The Bowen Municipality was constituted on 7 August 1863 under the Municipalities Act 1858 (a piece of New South Wales legislation inherited by Queensland at its separation four years earlier). On 11 November 1879, the Wangaratta Division was created as one of 74 divisions around Queensland under the Divisional Boards Act 1879. With the passage of the Local Authorities Act 1902, Wangaratta became a shire and Bowen became a town on 31 March 1903.

On 19 January 1910, the Shire of Proserpine was excised from Wangaratta. It was renamed on 18 February 1989.

On 2 April 1960, the Town of Bowen was abolished, and merged into the Shire of Wangaratta, which was renamed Bowen.

In July 2007, the Local Government Reform Commission released its report and recommended that the two areas amalgamate. Both councils and residents across the board opposed amalgamation, although amalgamation with each other was the preferred option of each if forced to choose. On 15 March 2008, the Shires formally ceased to exist, and elections were held on the same day to elect councillors and a mayor to the Regional Council.

In 2012, a petition signed by over 1600 people requested that the Whitsunday Region be de-amalgamated. Although the number of signatories was sufficiently large, the Queensland Government refused the request for a de-amalgamation vote arguing that the financial modelling did not show that deamalgamation would be financially viable.

In March 2017, many areas of the Whitsunday Region were damaged by Cyclone Debbie. The Proserpine Council Chambers was extensively damaged.

Cyclone Debbie recovery 
A new $6 million council administration building will be constructed in Proserpine during late 2018/2019, after this facility is completed workers that are temporarily being housed in Cannonvale will re-locate back to Proserpine. This will be a major new building that will also include a new disaster hub and resilience center.

Wards
The council is split into six divisions, each returning one councillor, plus a mayor.

Towns and localities 
The Whitsunday Region includes the following settlements:

Bowen area:
 Bowen
 Collinsville
 Binbee
 Bogie
 Brisk Bay
 Gumlu
 Guthalungra
 Inveroona
 Merinda
 Mount Coolon
 Mount Wyatt
 Newlands
 Queens Beach
 Scottville
 Springlands

Whitsunday area:
 Proserpine
 Airlie Beach
 Andromache
 Brandy Creek
 Breadalbane
 Cannon Valley
 Cannonvale
 Cape Conway
 Cape Gloucester
 Conway
 Conway Beach
 Crystal Brook
 Daydream Island
 Dingo Beach
 Dittmer
 Flametree

 Foxdale
 Glen Isla
 Gloucester Island
 Goorganga Creek
 Goorganga Plains
 Gregory River
 Gunyarra
 Hamilton Island
 Hamilton Plains
 Hayman Island
 Hideaway Bay
 Jubilee Pocket
 Kelsey Creek
 Laguna Quays
 Lake Proserpine
 Lethebrook
 Mandalay

 Mount Julian
 Mount Marlow
 Mount Pluto
 Mount Rooper
 Myrtlevale
 Palm Grove
 Pauls Pocket
 Preston
 Riordanvale
 Shute Harbour
 Silver Creek
 Strathdickie
 Sugarloaf
 Thoopara
 Wilson Beach
 Woodwark

Libraries 
The Whitsunday Regional Council operate public libraries at Bowen, Cannonvale, Collinsville, and Proserpine.

Population

List of mayors

 2008–2012: Mike Brunker
 2012–2016: Jennifer Whitney
 2016–2022: Andrew John Willcox

See also
 Whitsunday

References

 
North Queensland
Local government areas of Queensland
2008 establishments in Australia